Elections in the Regional Municipality of York of Ontario, Canada were held on October 27, 2014 in conjunction with municipal elections across the province.

York Regional Council

Returning candidates who stood for election included Heath (Markham), Jones (Markham) and Li (Markham). Long-time Markham councillor Landon and current Chair Bill Fisch did not return to council.

Aurora

East Gwillimbury

Georgina

King

Markham

Mayor

On October 16, 2014, Treacy 'withdrew' from the race and endorsed Kotyck. However his name still appeared on the ballot as his 'withdrawal' was past the deadline.

Regional Councillor

In Markham, Regional Councillors serve on both the City Council as well as York Region Council. Electors can vote for up to four candidates on their ballots, equal to the total number that may be elected. The four winning candidates are those whom receive the highest number of votes. The candidate with the highest number of votes received also serves as Deputy Mayor.

Incumbents Jack Heath, Jim Jones, and Joe Li sought re-election, while Gordon Landon announced his retirement before the close of nominations.

The election returned all standing incumbents to office. Landon's vacated seat was won by Nirmala Armstrong.

Ward 1

Markham reviewed the boundaries of its ward system in 2013. In an attempt to balance the City's electoral districts to match current population and growth patterns, it merged Thornhill's two wards into one. As a result, incumbents Burke and Shore ran against each other to represent the new ward.

Ward 2

New Ward 2 created for 2014 from former Ward 6 with old Ward 6 councillor Alan Ho running.  David Papadimitriou and Jim Kwan ran in old Ward 6 in last election.

Ward 3

The boundaries of the ward were left unchanged after the 2013 review. Incumbent Don Hamilton faced a wider field of challengers, none of which stood against him in 2010.

Ward 4

Ward 4 is newly created from former parts of old Ward 4 and 6. Phil Richardson has withdrawn from the race in Ward 4.

Ward 5

Ward 5 boundaries changed from 2010 with parts of former Ward 4.

Ward 6

Ward 6 is newly created from parts of old Wards 4 and 6. All new candidates as current Ward 6 councillor Alan Ho ran in the new Ward 2 and current Ward 4 Councillor Carolina Moretti ran in the new ward 4. Siow ran in the old Ward 4 in last election.

Ward 7

The ward boundaries were unchanged following the 2013 review. Khalid Usman is former Ward 7 councillor and ran for Ward 6 in 2010 and as regional councillor in 2006.

Ward 8

Ward 8 has new boundaries with parts transferred from old Wards 2 and 6.

Endorsements

Media
The Toronto Star endorsed Stephen Kotyck for Mayor

Community Groups
"Markham Residents for Responsible Community Planning" endorsed the following:
 Mayor - Frank Scarpitti
 Regional Councillors - Jim Jones, Joe Li, Peter Pavlovic, Sophia Sun
 Ward 1 - Valerie Burke
 Ward 2 - No Endorsement
 Ward 3 - Don Hamilton
 Ward 4 - Neil Thomas
 Ward 5 - John Egsgard
 Ward 6 - Cliff Redford
 Ward 7 - Logan Kanapathi
 Ward 8 - Peter Deboran

"Markham Citizens Coalition for Responsive Government" endorsed:
 Mayor - Stephen Kotyck
 Regional Councillors - Jack Heath, Jim Jones, Joe Li
 Ward 1 - Valerie Burke
 Ward 2 - Jim Kwan
 Ward 3 - Don Hamilton
 Ward 4 - Karen Rea
 Ward 5 - John Egsgard
 Ward 6 - Gin Siow
 Ward 7 - No Endorsement
 Ward 8 - Miriam Ku

Newmarket

Richmond Hill
As of September 2014, incumbent mayor Barrow is in court facing conflict on interest complaint and may be removed from office if found guilty, but the ruling may not be made until after the elections in October. Perrelli is incumbent Ward 2 councillor running as mayor.

Vaughan

Mayor

Regional councillors

Ward councillors

Whitchurch–Stouffville

Incumbent mayor Wayne Emmerson did not run in 2014. Incumbent Ward 2 councillor Bannon was a mayoral candidate.

Footnotes

References

York
Politics of the Regional Municipality of York